Mary Ainslee (born Florence Stiegler; October 12, 1914 – November 1, 1991), was an American film actress. She appeared in approximately 15 films between 1939 and 1952.

Career
Ainslee appeared in several Three Stooges films such as I'll Never Heil Again, In the Sweet Pie and Pie, Hokus Pokus, and He Cooked His Goose.

Death
In the mid-1980s, Ainslee suffered a stroke and never fully recovered. She died on November 1, 1991. She was buried in Riverside Memorial Park in Norfolk, Virginia.

Filmography

References

External links

 
 

1919 births
1991 deaths
20th-century American actresses
American film actresses